The TCW Heavyweight Championship was the primary professional wrestling singles title of Turnbuckle Championship Wrestling. It was originally won by Glacier who defeated Jorge Estrada in tournament final held in Ashburn, Georgia on July 6, 2000. It was defended primarily in the state of Georgia but throughout the Southern United States, most often in Dothan, Alabama, until the promotion's close in 2003.

Title history

References

Heavyweight wrestling championships